Lake Red Rock, also referred to as Red Rock Reservoir is a reservoir formed by Red Rock Dam on the Des Moines River, about 41 miles southeast of the city of Des Moines, Iowa, U.S. The dam was completed in 1969 as a Flood control project by the United States Army Corps of Engineers, creating the largest lake in Iowa. The lake is essentially confined to Marion County. The damface is a few miles west and south of Pella, and similarly, a few miles northeast of Knoxville.

Recreation and points of interest 
The lake shore has various recreational activities such as camping, hiking, boating and fishing. The state maintains Elk Rock State Park on both sides of the lake while Roberts Creek Park and Cordova Park (location of Cordova Tower) are managed by the Marion County Conservation Board.

The Army Corps of Engineers maintains several campgrounds as well: White Breast Recreation Area, Ivans Recreation Area, Wallashuck Recreation Area, Howell Station Recreation Area, and the North Overlook Recreation Area. There is also a "water trail", known as the Red Rock Water Trail, where one can float down the Des Moines River from the southeast corner of Polk County to the lake and down to Red Rock Dam. Flotilla 4 of the Coast Guard Auxiliary provides boating safety education and free vessel safety checks to boaters in the area.

A major landmark is what is locally called the "Mile Long Bridge", carrying Iowa Highway 14 at its upstream end.

References

External links

U.S. Army Corps of Engineers - Lake Red Rock
U.S. Army Corps of Engineers: Corps Lake Gateway – Lake Red Rock
Red Rock Dam
EPA statistics
Army Corps Map

Reservoirs in Iowa
Bodies of water of Marion County, Iowa